Ina Korter (born 8 January 1955 in Nordenham, Lower Saxony) is a former German politician for the Alliance '90/The Greens.

Political career
Korter became active with the Greens' antinuclear campaigns in 1982. She was a councillor in Wesermarsch from 1991 to 1996, and in Nordenham from 1996 to 1998. She studied teaching in Giessen and last taught at Paddstock School in Ovelgönne, before she was elected to the Lower Saxon Landtag in 2003 and remained until 2014.

Personal life 
Korter grew up with four siblings on the family farm near Nordenham. She has two adult children. As of 2011, she is in an all-woman band named Faltenrock.

References

1955 births
Living people
People from Nordenham
Alliance 90/The Greens politicians
Members of the Landtag of Lower Saxony
Women members of State Parliaments in Germany
20th-century German women politicians
21st-century German women politicians